The 2006–07 Cleveland State Vikings men's basketball team represented Cleveland State University in the 2006–07 college basketball season. The team was led by first-year head coach Gary Waters. In 2005–06, the Vikings finished 10–18 (6–10 in the Horizon League). Cleveland State's last winning season was the 2000–2001 season when they finished 19–13 overall and 9–5 in conference play. Their last NCAA tournament appearance was their run to the Sweet Sixteen in 1986. The highlight of the season was arguably when the Vikings went on a four-game winning streak defeating Miami (FL), John Carroll, Delaware, and Kent State. It was the 76th season of Cleveland State basketball.

Preseason 
The preseason Horizon League Coaches' Poll picked the Vikings to finish ninth. J'Nathan Bullock was named to the preseason all-Horizon League 2nd team.

Notable players 
 Carlos English

Schedule

References 

Cleveland State Vikings men's basketball seasons
Cleveland State Vikings
Viking
Viking